American Signature, Inc. is a privately owned furniture company based in Columbus, Ohio. It is the parent company of the retail brands American Signature Furniture and Value City Furniture, and the manufacturer brand American Signature.

American Signature Furniture and Value City Furniture 
American Signature Furniture and Value City Furniture sell residential furniture manufactured by American Signature, Inc., as well as more than 30 additional manufacturers from 125 locations around the East Coast, Midwest, and Southeastern United States.

Operating in about 18 U.S. states, American Signature Furniture and Value City Furniture offer living, dining, and bedroom furniture, various home furnishings, and outdoor patio pieces.

American Signature Furniture offers other furniture options to customers, and much like its sister store Value City Furniture, American Signature Furniture offers home furnishings.

History
Clothing store entrepreneur E.L. Schottenstein adapted his successful apparel store to sell furniture in the early 1900s after the post-World War II baby boom accelerated demand for furniture. Recognizing the expanding opportunity, Schottenstein created a separate business dedicated to furniture sales, later renaming it Value City Furniture.

Alvin Schottenstein and Value City Furniture 
In 1948, E.L. Schottenstein’s son, Alvin, took over the furniture portion of the family company and Value City Furniture.

Jay Schottenstein and American Signature, Inc. 
In 1976, Jay Schottenstein joined Value City Furniture and in 1984, he was named company president. In 1995, the proprietary furniture brand American Signature was formed. This line was sold in Value City Furniture stores.

With the addition of the proprietary American Signature brand, and the overall expansion of Value City Furniture, Jay knew it was time to completely break away from the department stores. In 2002, American Signature, Inc. was formed, and eventually the company completely separated from Schottenstein Stores Corporation.

American Signature, Inc. became the parent company of the retail brand Value City Furniture and the manufacturer brand, American Signature. But the biggest change came in 2003, when the company announced the launch of the American Signature Furniture retail brand, with their first store opening in Nashville, Tennessee.

Today
American Signature, Inc. continues to own and operate Value City Furniture, American Signature Furniture and American Signature. The retail stores are supported by a total of four distribution centers catering to all 120 store locations spanning 19 states throughout the Eastern United States.    

Also, a different furniture company, Value City of New Jersey. [VC NJ]     https://www.valuecitynj.com/stores/

References

Furniture retailers of the United States
Retail companies established in 1948
Companies based in the Columbus, Ohio metropolitan area
Retail companies of the United States
1948 establishments in Ohio
American companies established in 1948